Jim-Patrick Müller (born 4 August 1989) is a German professional footballer who plays for DJK Vilzing.

Müller's father, Bernd Müller, and grandfather, Heini Müller, were also footballers.

Müller made his professional debut for SSV Jahn Regensburg in the opening fixture of the 2011–12 3. Liga season at home to SV Babelsberg 03.

References

External links 
 
 Jim-Patrick Müller at kicker 

1989 births
Living people
Footballers from Munich
German footballers
Association football midfielders
2. Bundesliga players
3. Liga players
Regionalliga players
SpVgg Greuther Fürth players
SSV Jahn Regensburg players
SV Sandhausen players
Dynamo Dresden players
SpVgg Unterhaching players